Silke Demeyere (born 20 June 1992) is a Belgian footballer who plays as a midfielder for French Division 1 Féminine club Le Havre. She has been a member of the Belgium women's national team.

Club career
Demeyere has played for Zulte Waregem and Brugge in Belgium and for Lille in France.

International career
Demeyere has been capped for the Belgium national team, appearing for the team during the UEFA Women's Euro 2017 qualifying cycle.

References

External links
 

1992 births
Living people
Sportspeople from Kortrijk
Footballers from West Flanders
Belgian women's footballers
Women's association football midfielders
Club Brugge KV (women) players
Lille OSC (women) players
BeNe League players
Division 1 Féminine players
Belgium women's international footballers
Belgian expatriate women's footballers
Belgian expatriate sportspeople in France
Expatriate women's footballers in France